Mahan (also Romanized as Māhān or Mâhân; also known as Māhūn) is a city and capital of Mahan District, in Kerman County, Kerman Province, Iran.  At the 2006 census, its population was 16,787, in 4,138 families.

Mahan is well known for the tomb of the great Sufi leader Shah Ne'emat Ollah-e-Vali, as well as Shazdeh Garden (Prince Garden).

The tomb of Shah Nur-eddin Nematollah Vali, poet, sage, Sufi and founder of an order of darvishes, has twin minarets covered with turquoise tiles from the bottom up to the cupola. The mausoleum was built by Ahmad Shah Kani; the rest of the building was constructed during the reigns of Shah Abbas I, Mohammad Shah Qajar and Nasser-al-Din Shah. Shah Nematallah Wali spent many years wandering through central Asia perfecting his spiritual gifts before finally settling at Mahan, twenty miles south-east of Kerman, where he passed the last twenty five years of his life. He died in 1431, having founded a Darvish order which continues to be an active spiritual force today. The central domed burial vault at Mahan, completed in 1437 was erected by Ahmad Shah Bahmani, king of the Bahmani Sultanate, and one of Shah Nematallah's most devoted disciples.

References

External links

 Photographs of Mahan:
— Shāh Ne'matollah Vali: (1), (2)
— Bāgh-e Shāzdeh: (1)

Populated places in Kerman County
Cities in Kerman Province
Sasanian cities